Kaeng Krachan is a district (amphoe) of Phetchaburi province, western Thailand.

History
The district was created as a minor district (king amphoe) on 1 January 1988 by splitting off the three tambons Kaeng Krachan, Song Phi Nong, and Wang Chan from Tha Yang district. On 3 November 1993 it was upgraded to a full district.

Geography
Neighboring districts are (from the north clockwise) Nong Ya Plong, Ban Lat, and Tha Yang of Phetchaburi Province, and Hua Hin of Prachuap Khiri Khan province. To the west is the Tanintharyi Division of Myanmar.

Most of the area of the district are the forested hills of Kaeng Krachan National Park. Both the Phetchaburi and Pranburi Rivers originate in these hills. The district is among the least populated districts of Thailand.

Administration
The district is divided into six sub-districts (tambons), which are further subdivided into 52 villages (mubans). There are no municipal areas (thesaban) within the district, and six tambon administrative organizations (TAO).

Kaeng Krachan Library
The district houses a distinctive library, designed the Bangkok architectural firm junsekino.

References

External links
Kaeng Krachan National Park
amphoe.com

Kaeng Krachan